Swamp Fire is a 1946 American adventure film directed by William H. Pine and starring Johnny Weissmuller. The film pits two screen Tarzans against each other in their first film for Pine-Thomas Productions.

Plot
After World War Two, Johnny Duval returns home to the bayous of Louisiana where he was a U.S. Coast Guard bar pilot.  However, after serving in the Coast Guard, Johnny is affected by stress when he lost the destroyer escort under his command, blaming himself for the loss of the ship that was torpedoed. Initially Johnny refuses to take up his old piloting duties, offering to work as an ordinary seaman. He is tricked into filling in for a pilot and does an admirable job where he regains his confidence.

In the meantime Johnny is distracted from his bride to be Toni Rousseau by the visit of a spoiled rich city girl Janet Hilton whose father P.T. Hilton buys up land in the bayous and posts the areas for no hunting or fishing that has a devastating effect on the local culture. Local hot head and Johnny's rival Mike Kalavich knocks down the Hilton's signs and goes poaching on their land.

Cast
 Johnny Weissmuller as Johnny Duval
 Virginia Grey as Janet Hilton
 Buster Crabbe as Mike Kalavich
 Carol Thurston as Toni Rousseau
 Pedro de Cordoba as Tim Rousseau
 Marcelle Corday as Grandmere Rousseau
 William Edmunds as Emile Ledoux
 Edwin Maxwell as Capt. Pierre Moise
 Pierre Watkin as P.T. Hilton
 Charles Gordon as Capt. Hal Peyton
 Frank Fenton as Capt. Pete Dailey
 David Janssen as Emile's Eldest Son (uncredited)

Production
The film was meant to be the first of a three-picture deal between Weissmuller and Pine-Thomas Productions which was signed in February 1944. He was going to make Combat Correspondent about a war correspondent in the South Pacific, and a musical Western. However Weissmuller only made one film for the company.

Filming was to have started on 10 April 1945 but was delayed until October.

Weissmuller was paid $75,000 for the role.

See also
 List of American films of 1946
 Public domain film
 List of films in the public domain in the United States

References

External links

Swamp Fire at TCMDB
Review of film at Variety

1946 films
1946 adventure films
American adventure films
American black-and-white films
Films set in Louisiana
Films directed by William H. Pine
1940s English-language films
1940s American films